Skaters Gear 6 is a compilation album mostly of hardcore punk artists from USA and UK. It was originally released in 1995 in Japan as a 28-song CD.  The album was compiled by Flavour Records. The American version Hardcore Breakout USA Volume 2 was compiled and released in 1995.

Track listing

Skaters Gear 6
Disc 1
Part 1
 "On A String" - Dogs On Ice 2:51
 "People Suck" - No Use For A Name 2:08
 "Hi Jinx" - Fizgig 1:13
 "Backsight" - Caffeine 2:36
 "Im Nobody" - Shleprock 3:42
 "Fill It Up" - Hogan's Heroes 2:14
 "Get Along" - Passed 3:12
 "With A Capitol P" - Rail 2:45
 "Darth Vader" - Fizgig 3:26
 "No Race" - Corrupted Ideals 2:20
 "Flicknife Temper" - Sanity Assassins 3:04
 "Cant Break My Pride" - 2 Line Filler 2:25
 "Cold" - Hogan's Heroes 1:55
 "Messages" - Ultraman 2:34
 "Over The Edge" - Corrupted Ideals 1:54
 "La Mancha Candidate" - Ten Bright Spikes 2:45
 "Sky Flying By" - Samiam 3:54
 "Born Addicted" - No Use For A Name 2:36
 "Mineola" - Ten Bright Spikes 3:22
 "Its Your Right" - The Wretch 2:44
 "Fish People" - Christ on a Crutch 2:06
 "I Dont Care" - Corrupted Ideals 2:17
 "Self Destruct" - UK Subs 2:24
 "Acid Rain" - Reagan Youth 1:54
 "DMV" - No Use For A Name 3:08
 "Slow Stupid & Hungry" - MDC 1:09
 "Go Away" - Samiam 3:47
 "000,000" - Ten Bright Spikes 3:42

References

1995 compilation albums
Record label compilation albums
Punk rock compilation albums
Hardcore punk compilation albums
1995 albums